Luigi Ziliotto (8 February 1863 – 6 February 1922) was an Italian politician and irredentist. Ziliotto was an Italian senator. He was podestà of Zara (Zadar) several times.

Bibliography
 L.Monzali, Italiani di Dalmazia. Dal Risorgimento alla Grande Guerra, Le Lettere, Florence 2004
 L.Monzali, Italiani di Dalmazia. 1914–1924, Le Lettere, Florence 2007
 G.Soppelsa, Luigi Ziliotto, in F.Semi-V.Tacconi (cur.), Istria e Dalmazia. Uomini e tempi. Dalmazia, Del Bianco, Udine 1992

References

1863 births
1922 deaths
Dalmatian Italians
Politicians from Zadar
Members of the Senate of the Kingdom of Italy